Chung Cheng Park may refer to:

 Chung Cheng Park (Keelung) in Keelung, Taiwan
 Chung Cheng Park (Chiayi City) in Chiayi City, Taiwan